Nagui Asaad Youssef (a.k.a. Nagy Assaad Youssef)  ناجى أسعد, (born September 12, 1945), is a retired Egyptian  athlete (track and field) who represented Egypt in international athletics events in the 1970s and early 1980s in shot put and discus throw.

Biography
Nagui Asaad was born on 12 September 1945 to a Coptic family in the north of Egypt. He moved to Cairo where he graduated from The Faculty of Sport (Physical) Education for Boys at Helwan University, following that he worked as a member of teaching staff in the same faculty after graduation. During his work he obtained a PhD Degree in Physical education, and he currently works as a professor in the same faculty.

Nagui Asaad played in the Basketball team of Al Ahly Sporting club between 1966 and 1969  then he joined the Athletic team at the same club and became the Egyptian champion in Shot Put.

Along with his colleagues Hisham Greiss, Hassan Ahmed Hamad and Mohamed Naguib Hamed formed one of the strongest Egyptian teams in throw events, a lot of Egyptian sport experts consider them to be the strongest team Egypt ever had.

Following his retirement from competitive events he Worked for many years in Bahrain as a coach for the national Athletic team and returned to Egypt in the 1990s to work in the same field with the Egyptian national team  as the squad's technical manager.

In 1999 as he was setting up a throwing school in Egypt, he recruited Discus thrower Omar Ahmed El Ghazaly and hammer thrower Mohsen El Anany who joined the Egyptian squad after that and won championships in their fields under his supervision. Achievements of the Egyptian team under nagui Asaad's management were described as unprecedented in the history of Egypt's Athletics Federation since its 1910 founding.

Achievements
Nagui Asaad remains the only Egyptian athlete (track and field) to win Gold medals in three major championships, namely; All Africa Games, Mediterranean Games  and African Championships in Athletics. He has won a total of three medals at the Mediterranean Games one gold and two silver. He was the first Egyptian to exceed 20 metres in shot put throws.

Nagui Asaad and Abdel Herin (1955 Mediterranean Games Marathon) remain to date the only two Egyptian Track and field athletes to have won a Gold medal each in the Mediterranean Games.

Internationally he ranks as number 130 of the world's 150 all-time best throws shot put by 20.71 Metre.

Championships record throws
Nagui Asaad held the championship record of the African Championships since 1982 African Championships in Athletics, with a throw of 20.44 metres. until 2004 African Championships in Athletics  when Janus Robberts achieved 21.02.

His record shot put throw in All Africa games of 19.48 stood since 1973 All-Africa Games as the championship record for twenty six years until Burger Lambrechts broke it at the 1999 All-Africa Games.

Between 1971 and 1979 Nagui Asaad held the championship record of the Mediterranean Games in Shot Put with a throw of 20.19 Meters, this record was broken by Vladimir Milić from Yugoslavia in 1979.

Shot Put Medals
Twice African champion in Shot Put, 1979, 1982.
Gold medallist in shot put of the 1971 Mediterranean Games, İzmir (Turkey) 
Twice Gold  medallist in Shot Put of the All Africa Games, 1973, Nigeria, 1978, Algeria
Twice Gold  medallist in Shot Put of East and Central African Championships  1981, 1982.
Gold medallist in shot put of the 1980 Liberty Bell Classic (19.69 m), (Olympic Boycott Games) the alternative event arranged for those nations boycotting the 1980 Olympic Games 
Silver medallist in shot put of the 1979 Mediterranean Games, Split, Yugoslavia

Discus  medals
Silver medallist in Discus throw of the 1971 Mediterranean Games, İzmir (Turkey)
Silver medallist in Discus throw of the All Africa Games, Nigeria, 1973 .

Olympic Games
Despite multiple attempts, Nagui Asaad never competed in any of the Summer Olympic Games 

 1968 Summer Olympics, Nagui Asaad missed qualifying for the Egyptian Olympic team - by two centimeters.
1972 Summer Olympics, he went with the Egyptian team to Munich, but was withdrawn by his government after the Munich massacre when members of the Israeli Olympic team were taken hostage and eventually murdered by the Islamic terrorist group Black September.
1976 Summer Olympics, after arrival to Montréal, Egypt withdrew from the Games  as part of the anti-apartheid boycott. This was due to that in 1972 and 1976 a large number of African countries threatened the IOC with a boycott to force them to ban South Africa and Rhodesia, because of their segregationist regimes. New Zealand was also one of the African boycott targets, due to the "All Blacks" (national rugby team) having toured apartheid-ruled South Africa. The IOC conceded in the first two cases, but refused to ban New Zealand on the grounds that rugby was not an Olympic sport. Fulfilling their threat, twenty African countries were joined by Guyana and Iraq in a Tanzania-led withdrawal from the Montreal Games, after a few of their athletes had already competed. Athletes from Cameroon, Egypt, Morocco, and Tunisia competed on July 18–20 before these nations withdrew from the Games.
1980 Summer Olympics, Egypt Boycotted the Moscow Games and he went to become the Gold medallist in shot put of the 1980 Liberty Bell Classic, (Olympic Boycott Games) the alternative event arranged for those nations boycotting the 1980 Olympic Games.

See also
Egyptian athletes
List of prominent Copts
Athletics at the 1973 All-Africa Games
Athletics at the 1978 All-Africa Games
1979 African Championships in Athletics
1982 African Championships in Athletics
List of Egyptians
Helwan University
African Championships in Athletics
Mediterranean Games
All Africa Games
List of champions of Africa of athletics

References

External links
 African Championships in Athletics results on gbrathletics website 
Mediterranean Games Athletic results  gbrathletics website 
 All Africa Games Athletics results gbrathletics website
gbrathletics website East and Central African Championships  results
GBR Athletics Egyptian athletics championships winners since 1981
Article on Arabs in 1971 Mediterranean Games Izmir 
 Helwan University Faculty of Physical Education webpage

1945 births
Egyptian male shot putters
Egyptian male discus throwers
Egyptian people of Coptic descent
Living people
Helwan University alumni
Academic staff of Helwan University
Mediterranean Games gold medalists for Egypt
Mediterranean Games silver medalists for Egypt
Athletes (track and field) at the 1971 Mediterranean Games
Athletes (track and field) at the 1979 Mediterranean Games
African Games gold medalists for Egypt
African Games medalists in athletics (track and field)
Mediterranean Games medalists in athletics
Athletes (track and field) at the 1973 All-Africa Games
Athletes (track and field) at the 1978 All-Africa Games
Egyptian academics
20th-century Egyptian people